Mohammed Huwaidi Al-Hooti (born 19 January 1986), commonly known as Mohammed Huwaidi, is an Omani footballer who plays as a goalkeeper for Al-Nahda Club.

Club career statistics

International career
Mohammed was selected for the national team for the first time in 2007. He has made appearances in the 2011 AFC Asian Cup qualification and the 2010 Gulf Cup of Nations and has represented the national team in the 2010 FIFA World Cup qualification and the 2014 FIFA World Cup qualification.

Honours

Club
 Omani Super Cup (1): 2011

References

External links
 
 
 
 

1986 births
Living people
Omani footballers
Oman international footballers
Association football goalkeepers
Muscat Club players
Al-Orouba SC players
Ahli Sidab Club players
Al-Nahda Club (Oman) players